Topisaw Creek is a stream in the U.S. state of Mississippi. It is a tributary to Bogue Chitto.

Topisaw is a name derived from the Choctaw language purported to mean "little chestnut". Variant names are "East Topisaw Creek", "Otapasso Creek", "Otuspasso Brook", "Topisaw River", and "Topsaw River".

References

Rivers of Mississippi
Rivers of Lincoln County, Mississippi
Rivers of Pike County, Mississippi
Mississippi placenames of Native American origin